Harrisia portoricensis is a species of cactus in the genus Harrisia.<ref>{{ITIS |id=19864 |taxon=Harrisia portoricensis}}</ref> Its common names include higo chumbo'' and Puerto Rico applecactus.

Distribution
It is endemic to Puerto Rico, where it is known from three smaller islands off the coast of the main island. The population is estimated at 59,000 on Mona Island, 148 individuals on Monito Island, and only 9 on Desecheo Island.

References

portoricensis
Cacti of North America
Endemic flora of Puerto Rico
Endangered flora of North America
Endangered flora of the United States
Plants described in 1908